Lost Cities and Vanished Civilizations is a 1962 book by Robert Silverberg that deals with the then-current archaeology studies of six past civilizations.  The book is divided into six chapters, and each deals with a particular civilization: Pompeii, Troy, Nicola, Babylon, Chichen Itza, and Angkor Wat.  Silverberg also deals with the historical search for the past through the life works of archaeologists such as Heinrich Schliemann and Henry Rawlinson.

References

1962 non-fiction books
Archaeology books
Books by Robert Silverberg